Joseph William Kleine (born January 4, 1962) is a retired American professional basketball player who played fifteen seasons in the National Basketball Association (NBA) and for the US national team. He won a gold medal as a member of the United States men's basketball team at the 1984 Summer Olympics in Los Angeles. In 1998, he won the NBA championship as a member of the Chicago Bulls. Kleine is now a restaurant proprietor, owning a number of successful Corky's Ribs & BBQ restaurants.

College career
Kleine, a seven-foot center, graduated from Slater High School in Slater, Missouri and originally enrolled to play basketball at the University of Notre Dame.  After his freshman season, Kleine transferred to the University of Arkansas where he played alongside Darrell Walker and Alvin Robertson, who, like Kleine, would go on to have productive professional careers. 

Kleine's first season at Arkansas, he helped the Razorbacks to a 26-4 record, finish second in the Southwest Conference (SWC), and make the second round the NCAA Tournament. His junior season, Kleine helped Arkansas to a record of 25-7, another second place finish in the SWC, and a first round loss in the NCAA Tournament. The biggest victory of the season came on February 12, 1984 at the Convention Center in Pine Bluff, Arkansas, when Kleine helped the Razorbacks upset the #1 ranked North Carolina Tarheels, led by Michael Jordan, thanks to a basket by teammate Charles Balentine at the end of the game. It is considered one of the greatest victory's in Razorback basketball history. Kleine finished that game with 20 points and 10 rebounds. As a senior in the 1984-85 season, Kleine was named 1st Team All-SWC. Arkansas (22-13) finished second in the SWC for the third year in a row, and a second round loss in the NCAA Tournament. During his career at Arkansas, Kleine's most memorable games were against fellow center Hakeem Olajuwon and the University of Houston. Olajuwon was nicknamed "The Dream", while Kleine was known as "The Nightmare".

Professional career
Kleine was selected by the Sacramento Kings with the sixth pick in the 1985 NBA Draft.  Kleine went on to have a fifteen-year NBA career, playing with the Kings as well as the Boston Celtics, Phoenix Suns, Los Angeles Lakers, New Jersey Nets, Chicago Bulls, and Portland Trail Blazers. Kleine played on teams with legendary NBA players Michael Jordan, Charles Barkley, Larry Bird, Kevin McHale, Robert Parish, Scottie Pippen, and Dennis Rodman. He won an NBA championship in 1998, as a center, for a Chicago Bulls team that included Michael Jordan, Scottie Pippen, Dennis Rodman, and Steve Kerr.

His best season was with the Kings in 1985, when he averaged 9.8 PPG. At the time of his retirement from the NBA, he'd scored 4,666 points, had 3,991 total rebounds, and had scored 849 free throws out of 1,069 attempts.

National team career
Kleine played for the US national team in the 1982 FIBA World Championship, winning the silver medal. Along with his college teammate Robertson, he also won a gold medal as a member of the 1984 U.S. Olympic basketball team coached by Bob Knight. Sportswriter Jon Goode would later write that "Joe Kleine was never a star, but what made Kleine great was that he accepted his role and was ready to play every night."

Coaching career
After coaching AAU and high school basketball in Little Rock and serving as an analyst for Arkansas basketball games, Kleine was hired as an assistant coach at the University of Arkansas at Little Rock in 2007.

Movie appearances
Kleine appeared in the 1996 movie Eddie as himself.

Career statistics

NBA

Source

Regular season

|-
| style="text-align:left;"| 
| style="text-align:left;"| Sacramento
| 80 || 18 || 14.8 || .465 || – || .723 || 4.7 || .6 || .3 || .4 || 5.2
|-
| style="text-align:left;"| 
| style="text-align:left;"| Sacramento
| 79 || 31 || 21.0 || .471 || .000 || .786 || 6.1 || .9 || .4 || .4 || 7.9
|-
| style="text-align:left;"| 
| style="text-align:left;"| Sacramento
| 82 || 60 || 24.4 || .472 || – || .814 || 7.1 || 1.1 || .3 || .7 || 9.8
|-
| style="text-align:left;"| 
| style="text-align:left;"| Sacramento
| 47 || 11 || 19.4 || .383 || .000  || .920 || 5.1 || .7 || .4 || .4 || 6.7
|-
| style="text-align:left;"| 
| style="text-align:left;"| Boston
| 28 || 2 || 17.8 || .457 || .000 || .828 || 4.9 || 1.1 || .5 || .2 || 6.1
|-
| style="text-align:left;"| 
| style="text-align:left;"| Boston
| 81 || 4 || 16.9 || .480 || .000 || .830 || 4.4 || .6 || .2 || .3 || 5.4
|-
| style="text-align:left;"| 
| style="text-align:left;"| Boston
| 72 || 1 || 11.8 || .468 || .000 || .783 || 3.4 || .3 || .2 || .2 || 3.6
|-
| style="text-align:left;"| 
| style="text-align:left;"| Boston
| 70 || 3 || 14.2 || .491 || .500 || .708 || 4.2 || .5 || .3 || .2 || 4.7
|-
| style="text-align:left;"| 
| style="text-align:left;"| Boston
| 78 || 3 || 14.5 || .404 || .000 || .707 || 4.4 || .5 || .2 || .2 || 3.3
|-
| style="text-align:left;"| 
| style="text-align:left;"| Phoenix
| 74 || 4 || 11.5 || .488 || .455 || .769 || 2.6 || .6 || .2 || .3 || 3.9
|-
| style="text-align:left;"| 
| style="text-align:left;"| Phoenix
| 75 || 42 || 12.6 || .449 || .000 || .857 || 3.5 || .5 || .2 || .2 || 3.7
|-
| style="text-align:left;"| 
| style="text-align:left;"| Phoenix
| 56 || 9 || 11.8 || .420 || .286 || .800 || 2.4 || .8 || .2 || .1 || 2.9
|-
| style="text-align:left;"| 
| style="text-align:left;"| Phoenix
| 23 || 10 || 15.9 || .400 || 1.000 || .722 || 3.5 || .5 || .4 || .3 || 3.4
|-
| style="text-align:left;"| 
| style="text-align:left;"| L.A. Lakers
| 8 || 0 || 3.8 || .250 || – || 1.000 || 1.1 || .0 || .0 || .0 || .8
|-
| style="text-align:left;"| 
| style="text-align:left;"| New Jersey
| 28 || 0 || 16.2 || .427 || .500 || .722 || 4.1 || .8 || .3 || .4 || 3.0
|-
| style="text-align:left;background:#afe6ba;"| †
| style="text-align:left;"| Chicago
| 46 || 1 || 8.6 || .368 || – || .833 || 1.7 || .7 || .1 || .1 || 2.0
|-
| style="text-align:left;"| 
| style="text-align:left;"| Phoenix
| 31 || 5 || 12.1 || .405 || .000 || .667 || 2.2 || .4 || .3 || .0 || 2.2
|-
| style="text-align:left;"| 
| style="text-align:left;"| Portland
| 7 || 0 || 4.4 || .364 || – || 1.000 || .9 || .3 || .1 || .0 || 1.6
|-class="sortbottom"
| style="text-align:center;" colspan="2" | Career
| 965 || 204 || 15.2 || .453 || .271 || .794 || 4.1 || .6 || .3 || .3 || 4.8

Playoffs

|-
| style="text-align:left;"| 1986
| style="text-align:left;"| Sacramento
| 3 || 0 || 15.0 || .385 || – || .833 || 4.7 || .3 || .3 || .3 || 5.0
|-
| style="text-align:left;"| 1989
| style="text-align:left;"| Boston
| 3 || 0 || 21.7 || .545 || .000 || .778 || 5.7 || .7 || .0 || .3 || 6.3
|-
| style="text-align:left;"| 1990
| style="text-align:left;"| Boston
| 5 || 0 || 15.8 || .765 || .000 || .833 || 2.8 || .4 || .4 || .6 || 6.2
|-
| style="text-align:left;"| 1991
| style="text-align:left;"| Boston
| 5 || 1 || 6.2 || .444 || – || – || 2.2 || .2 || .0 || .0 || 1.6
|-
| style="text-align:left;"| 1992
| style="text-align:left;"| Boston
| 9 || 0 || 9.1 || .409 || .000 || 1.000 || 2.4 || .1 || .0 || .1 || 2.2
|-
| style="text-align:left;"| 1993
| style="text-align:left;"| Boston
| 4 || 0 || 7.3 || .600 || – || – || 1.3 || .0 || .0 || .3 || 1.5
|-
| style="text-align:left;"| 1994
| style="text-align:left;"| Phoenix
| 8 || 0 || 10.1 || .429 || – || .667 || 2.1 || .4 || .1 || .5 || 3.5
|-
| style="text-align:left;"| 1995
| style="text-align:left;"| Phoenix
| 10 || 10 || 16.7 || .574 || .500 || – || 3.1 || .8 || .5 || .3 || 6.3
|-
| style="text-align:left;"| 1996
| style="text-align:left;"| Phoenix
| 2 || 0 || 4.0 || .000 || – || – || .5 || .0 || .5 || .0 || .0
|-
| style="text-align:left;"| 1999
| style="text-align:left;"| Phoenix
| 1 || 0 || 5.0 || .500 || – || – || 1.0 || .0 || 1.0 || 1.0 || 2.0
|-class="sortbottom"
| style="text-align:center;" colspan="2" | Career
| 50 || 11 || 11.8 || .515 || .200 || .793 || 2.7 || .4 || .2 || .3 || 3.8

References

External links
Career Statistics at Basketball Reference
Hog Greats

1962 births
Living people
American men's basketball players
Arkansas Razorbacks men's basketball players
Basketball players at the 1984 Summer Olympics
Basketball players from Colorado Springs, Colorado
Boston Celtics players
Centers (basketball)
Chicago Bulls players
Little Rock Trojans men's basketball coaches
Los Angeles Lakers players
McDonald's High School All-Americans
Medalists at the 1984 Summer Olympics
New Jersey Nets players
Notre Dame Fighting Irish men's basketball players
Olympic gold medalists for the United States in basketball
Parade High School All-Americans (boys' basketball)
Phoenix Suns players
Portland Trail Blazers players
Sacramento Kings draft picks
Sacramento Kings players
Sportspeople from Colorado Springs, Colorado
United States men's national basketball team players
1982 FIBA World Championship players